Neil Sandilands "Sandy" Kennon (28 November 1933 – 17 August 2015) was a professional footballer and amateur cricketer. His position was goalkeeper. He made 367 appearances in the Football League playing for Huddersfield Town, Norwich City and Colchester United.
He also played rugby for Beccles Rugby club

Career
After beginning his career in his native South Africa where he played for Umbilo FC, Berea Park and Queen's Park, he was spotted by Huddersfield Town while playing for Rhodesia. He signed for the Terriers in 1956 and stayed there for three years before joining Norwich City in early 1959. Kennon was a member of the legendary Norwich team that reached the FA Cup semi-finals in 1959 as a Third Division team and he played in both of the semi-final matches against Luton Town, having replaced the injured Ken Nethercott for the 6th round replay against Sheffield United. The following season, he played a key role as Norwich won promotion to the Second Division of the Football League.

Kennon went on to play for Colchester United and Lowestoft Town before retiring. He was a bookmaker for many years after he stopped playing and also, for a while, had his own band called 'Sandy Kennon and the Blazers'.

Kennon is a member of the Norwich City F.C. Hall of Fame.

Outside of football, Kennon played cricket for Norfolk as a right-handed batsman and right-arm medium pace bowler.  Kennon made three appearances for the county in the 1970 Minor Counties Championship. He died on 17 August 2015.

Honours

Club
Norwich City
 Football League Cup Winner (1): 1961–62

References
General
Canary Citizens by Mike Davage, John Eastwood, Kevin Platt, published by Jarrold Publishing, (2001), 
Specific

1933 births
2015 deaths
South African soccer players
Sportspeople from Johannesburg
English Football League players
Association football goalkeepers
Huddersfield Town A.F.C. players
Norwich City F.C. players
Colchester United F.C. players
South African cricketers
Norfolk cricketers